Patricia Martínez Augusto (born 15 March 1990) is a Spanish footballer, who formerly played for ASPTT Albi in France's Division 1 Féminine.

Personal life

Born in Ponferrada (El Bierzo). She started playing soccer with four years in the CD Fuentesnuevas (where her older brother played too) being the only girl. And at eight, Patri already found her first hurdle to achieving her dream: Castile and León Football Federation (FCyLF) only federated boys in this time, however she became the first girl in the province of León to record as a female footballer .

When she was thirteen years old, she was selected to represent the Castile and León women's autonomous under-17 football team and the following year she was the captain of this team.

At fifteen she transferred to FC Barcelona, where played with the B-side one year later. With sixteen years old, Patri feels his greatest dream come true: she is loaded in Oviedo Moderno CF to gain experience, and becomes the top scorer in her team and is confirmed for the Spain under-19 team. call that would not leave for three years, giving you get trophies for best player and top scorer in Atlantic Tournament. The girl that her mother dressed in the bathroom of a school with four years so she could playing soccer with boys had become captain of the U19 National Team.

The beginning of the 2008–09 season was promising for her. Patri had played 11 of the first 12 games of her team (with the "number 7" on her back) and scored 2 goals, but before the end of the first round of the Superliga she suffered a back injury. Injury that is much delayed in time, and a chronic pain in this area and as a consequence of this a lack of confidence that led her to not renew her contract with FC Barcelona and having to find accommodation in the club of her city (CD Ponferrada) which at that time was fighting to promoted to Primera División, and where she was converted into a deep-lying playmaker momentarily.

At the end of the 2013–2014 season CD Ponferrada relegated to Regional Division (third level of league competition for Spanish women's football), despite this Patri was considered one of the best attacking midfielders in the tournament (18 goals in 25 league matches), which led her to sign with a Primera División team: Sporting de Huelva, coincidentally the same team that she had scored a hat-trick years ago. There she played 11 games in league (531 minutes) with the blanquiazul shirt and getting 4 goals.

On January 6, 2015, El Día de los Reyes (The Day of the Kings) or Epiphany day her signing for ASPTT Albi, newly promoted team to the Division 1 Féminine was announced. Her debut with les Jaunardes was delayed by bureaucratic reasons until 5 February 2015 in a home game against Paris Saint-Germain (17th game) at Stade Maurice Rigaud in Albi. She scored her first D1 goal against Arras FCF in her second match as a starter.

Career statistics

Club

International

International goals (under-19)

Hat-tricks

4 5

Honours
 Torneo del Atlántico most valuable player: 2007 
 Torneo del Atlántico leading scorer: 2007 
 Trofeo Quini (female top scorer in Asturias): 2007, 2008

References

External links
 
 

1990 births
Living people
Expatriate women's footballers in France
Spanish women's footballers
FC Barcelona Femení players
Sporting de Huelva players
ASPTT Albi players
Division 1 Féminine players
Women's association football midfielders
Women's association football forwards
Real Oviedo (women) players
FC Barcelona Femení B players
People from Ponferrada
Sportspeople from the Province of León
Footballers from Castile and León